This is a list of weapons used by Ethiopia during the Second Italo-Ethiopian War. Ethiopian weapons mainly consisted of the various small arms Ethiopia had brought over the years.

Small arms

Rifles 
 Fusil Gras mle 1874-Most popular
 Chassepot
 Lebel Model 1886 rifle
 Berthier rifle
 FN Model 24 and Model 30
 Mauser Model 1871
 Mauser Standardmodell
 Gewehr 1888
 Gewehr 98
 Werndl–Holub rifle
 Kropatschek rifle
 Mannlicher M1888
 Mannlicher M1890 Carbine
 Mannlicher M1895
 M1870 Italian Vetterli
 Carcano
 Snider–Enfield
 Martini–Henry
 Berdan rifle
 Remington Rolling Block rifle

Machine guns 
 Madsen machine gun
 M1918 Browning Automatic Rifle
 ZB vz. 26
 ZB vz. 30
 Hotchkiss Mle 1914 machine gun
 M1917 Browning machine gun

Submachine guns 
 MP 34
 MP35
 OVP 1918

Traditional weapons

Swords 
 Shotel

Spears 
 Spear

Bows 
Bow and arrow

Armoured fighting vehicles(AFV's)

Tanks 
 Fiat 3000-Three Model 1921 models bought from pre-fascist Italy.

Tankettes 
 L3/33-Captured from Italy during the war.

References

Second Italo-Ethiopian War weapons of Ethiopia
Italo-Ethiopian